Leif Vollebekk is a Canadian indie folk singer-songwriter, whose 2017 album Twin Solitude was a shortlisted finalist for the 2017 Polaris Music Prize and the 2018 Juno Award for Adult Alternative Album of the Year.

Of mixed Norwegian and French descent and originally from Ottawa, Ontario, he learned to play violin, guitar and piano in childhood. While studying philosophy at the University of Ottawa he spent some time in Iceland on an educational exchange, before moving to Montreal after graduation to pursue his musical career.

His debut album, Inland, was released on Nevado Records in 2010, and incorporated some songs he had written during his trip to Iceland. He followed up with North Americana in 2013 on Outside Music. He then signed to Secret City Records, which released Twin Solitude in 2017.

All three albums were supported by extensive touring in both North America and Europe.

His fourth album, New Ways, was released November 1, 2019 on Secret City Records.

He also contributed to Piano mal, the 2012 debut album by Julien Sagot.

Discography
Inland (2010)
North Americana (2013)
Twin Solitude (2017)
New Ways (2019)

References

External links

Canadian male singer-songwriters
Canadian folk singer-songwriters
Canadian folk rock musicians
Musicians from Ottawa
Musicians from Montreal
University of Ottawa alumni
Living people
Canadian people of Norwegian descent
Franco-Ontarian people
21st-century Canadian male singers
Year of birth missing (living people)
Indie folk musicians